Planifilum yunnanense  is a thermophilic bacterium from the genus of Planifilum which has been isolated from a hot spring in Yunnan in China.

References

External links
Type strain of Planifilum yunnanense at BacDive -  the Bacterial Diversity Metadatabase

Bacillales
Bacteria described in 2007
Thermophiles